Nana is an intersection and neighbourhood at the beginning of Sukhumvit Road (Highway 3) in Khlong Toei Subdistrict, Khlong Toei District and Khlong Toei Nuea Subdistrict, Watthana District, downtown Bangkok.

Characteristics
Nana is the four-ways intersection of Sukhumvit Road; Soi Sukhumvit 3 (ซอยสุขุมวิท 3; Sukhumvit 3 Alley) or Soi Nana Nuea (ซอยนานาเหนือ; North Nana Alley), the location of Nana Nuea Pier (E3), the stop of Khlong Saen Saep boat service and shortcut to New Phetchaburi Road in Ratchathewi District's Makkasan at Mit Samphan Intersection; and Soi Sukhumvit 4 (ซอยสุขุมวิท 4; Sukhumvit 4 Alley) or Soi Nana Tai (ซอยนานาใต้; South Nana Alley), which toward the Thailand Tobacco Monopoly. It can be considered as an intersection next to Phloen Chit Intersection on Phloen Chit Road in the area of Lumphini Subdistrict, Pathum Wan District

Nana, Bangkok have two different distinct characteristics. In the morning you have the rush hour of locals or expats going to work via motorbike or taking the BTS Skytrain.Second you have people drinking coffees in the morning at various different coffee shops such as Coffee Club or Starbucks. Or some locals cafes in Soi 11 at Nana. 

Nana at night is a completely different story. You have plenty of night lifestyle leisure spots in hotels, along the curb-side, and different bars and restaurants. Some popular choices to go out in Nana is at Fraser Suite Hotel at Above Eleven. Other more popular choices are at are local burger joints such as Bang Bang burgers, or Chen Z Homemade Cafe or a fancy restaurant on the first floor of Mercure Hotel restaurant name Little Fu.

Background 

Its name is derived from the surname of Lek Nana, a former Thai-Indian politician and real estate entrepreneur, who has the alias "Bangkok landlord", because he owned much of the land in this area and was the first entrepreneur to invest here since the 1970s.

The area near the Nana. It's the location of Nana BTS station, which located next to Soi Sukhumvit 7 and Sukhumvit soi 11 on the left side. You would see a 7-11 and just 200 meters away is Sofitel Hotel. And in the surrounding area is also the location of the leading hotels and condominiums. It is also home to a large number of shopping centers, restaurants, pubs, bars. Including also a residence of foreigners of various nationalities and religions, most prominently Arabs, with many Middle Eastern restaurants and businesses with Arabic labels in Soi Arab.

References

Neighbourhoods of Bangkok
Khlong Toei district
Watthana district
Road junctions in Bangkok
Tourist attractions in Bangkok